Stan Cockerton (born May 19, 1955) is a former All-American lacrosse player for the NC State Wolfpack men's lacrosse team from 1977 to 1980, leading the Wolfpack to its only NCAA Men's Lacrosse Championship tournament appearance in 1979.

Career

Cockerton is ranked fourth all-time in NCAA career goals with 193 and is second in points per game at 6.36. He led the Wolfpack to 30 wins from 1977 to 1980, with two second-place finishes in the Atlantic Coast Conference. North Carolina State cancelled the varsity lacrosse program in 1983. Stan once scored 11 goals in one game, against Salisbury State in 1979.

Cockerton, a three time first-team All American, learned the game in Ontario playing box lacrosse for the famed Oshawa Green Gaels junior team. He also teamed with Mike French for the 1978 Canadian National Team upset over a heavily favored U.S. team, scoring the overtime winning goal. Cockerton also played for the Brooklin Redmen in Major Series Lacrosse, while he was going to school at North Carolina State, scoring over 200 points for the Redmen.

Cockerton is currently the president of the Ontario Lacrosse Association and is the founder of  the Heritage Cup. He was formerly the president of the Federation of International Lacrosse. Stan was inducted into the Canadian Lacrosse Hall of Fame in 2003 and the National Lacrosse Hall of Fame in 2014.

Stan is the father of Mark and Matt Cockerton, two highly touted players from the OLA Junior A Lacrosse League, who played college lacrosse at the University of Virginia.

Statistics

North Carolina State University

1st in Division I career goals per game
3rd in Division I career points per game

OLA Jr A and MSL

See also
Canadian Lacrosse Hall of Fame
Division I men's lacrosse records
NC State Wolfpack men's lacrosse
Oshawa Green Gaels

References

 Canadian Lacrosse Hall Of Fame entry
 Heritage Cup website
 1978 USILA Men’s All-Americans
 Atlantic Coast Conference Men’s Lacrosse records
 Bible of Lacrosse Canadian Box Lacrosse Stats
 National Lacrosse Hall of Fame Welcomes Class of 2014
 When The Wolfpack Roamed the Lacrosse Field Lacrosse Bucket

1955 births
Canadian expatriate lacrosse people in the United States
Canadian lacrosse players
Lacrosse people from Ontario
Living people
NC State Wolfpack men's lacrosse players
Sportspeople from Oshawa